For information on all Henderson State University sports, see Henderson State Reddies

The Henderson State Reddies football program is a college football team that represents Henderson State University. The team is a member of the Great American Conference which is in the Division II of the National Collegiate Athletic Association and are currently coached by Scott Maxfield, who is in his seventh year at the university. Home games are played at Carpenter-Haygood Stadium in Arkadelphia, Arkansas. Henderson State shares the longest rivalry in Division II football with Ouachita Baptist University Tigers, the Battle of the Ravine, which began in 1895. Gus Malzahn, who played wide receiver for the Reddies, is one of their most famous alumni.

Head Coaches

The Henderson State Reddies have had 18 head coaches since they began play in 1905.

The team has played 1,028 games in 116 seasons of Reddie football. In that time, Scott Maxfield led the Reddies to four postseason bowl games. Seven coaches have won conference championships: Bo Rowland, Bo Sherman, Duke Wells, Jim Mack Sawyer, Clyde Berry, Sporty Carpenter, and Scott Maxfield. Jimmy Haygood also claimed four Arkansas state championships.

Sporty Carpenter is the leader in seasons coached and games won, with 119 victories during his 19 years at Henderson. J.H. Lassiter has the highest winning percentage with .833. Patrick Nix has the lowest winning percentage with .136. 

The current head coach is Scott Maxfield, who was hired in 2005.

Playoff appearances

NAIA
The Reddies made two appearances in the NAIA playoffs, with a combined record of 1-2.

NCAA Division II 
The Reddies have made three appearances in the NCAA Division II playoffs, with a combined record of 1-3.

Rivalries

Ouachita Baptist Tigers

References

External links
 

 
American football teams established in 1905
1905 establishments in Arkansas